Adamstown Rosebud were the Minor Premiers as well as Grand Final winners in 2013. They were promoted to the newly formed NNSW National Premier Leagues for the 2014 season.

League tables

Finals

Results

References

External links
 Official website

2013 domestic association football leagues